This articles shows a list of cities in Seychelles.

List
Anse Boileau
Beau Vallon
Takamaka
Victoria, capital and largest city
Grand Anse Mahe

See also
Districts of Seychelles

References

 
Cities
Seychelles
Seychelles